Raden Adjeng Kartini (21 April 1879 – 17 September 1904), also known as Raden Ayu Kartini, was a prominent Indonesian activist who advocated for women's rights and female education.

She was born into an aristocratic Javanese family in the Dutch East Indies (present-day Indonesia). After attending a Dutch-language primary school, she wanted to pursue further education, but Javanese women at the time were barred from higher education. She met various officials and influential people, including J.H. Abendanon, who was in charge of implementing the Dutch Ethical Policy.

After her death, her sisters continued her advocacy of educating girls and women. Kartini's letters were published in a Dutch magazine and eventually, in 1911, as the works: Out of Darkness to Light, Women's Life in the Village, and Letters of a Javanese Princess. Her birthday is now celebrated in Indonesia as Kartini Day in her honor, as well as multiple schools being named after her and a fund being established in her name to finance the education of girls in Indonesia. She was interested in mysticism and opposed polygamy.

Biography

Kartini was born into an aristocratic Javanese family when Java was part of the Dutch colony of the Dutch East Indies. Kartini's father, Sosroningrat, became Bupati (or Regent) for the Regency of Jepara after originally being the district chief of Mayong. Her mother, Ngasirah, was the daughter of Madirono and a religious teacher at Telukawur. She was Sosroningrat's first wife but not his most important one. At this time, polygamy was a common practice among the nobility. Colonial regulations required regents to marry a member of the nobility. Since Ngasirah was not of sufficiently high nobility, Sosroningrat married a second time to Woerjan (Moerjam), a direct descendant of the Raja of Madura. After this second marriage, Kartini's father was elevated to  Bupati of Jepara, replacing his second wife's father, Tjitrowikromo.

Kartini was the fifth child and second-eldest daughter in a family of eleven, including half-siblings. She was born into a family with a strong intellectual tradition. Her grandfather, Pangeran Ario Tjondronegoro IV, became a regent at the age of 25, while Kartini's older brother, Sosrokartono, was an accomplished linguist. Kartini's family allowed her to attend school until she was 12 years old. Here, among other subjects, she learned Dutch, an unusual accomplishment for Javanese women at the time. After she turned 12 she was secluded (pingit) at home, which was a common practice among young female Javanese nobles, to prepare them for wedlock. During seclusion, girls were not allowed to leave their parents' house until they were married, after which the authority over them was transferred to their husbands. Kartini's father was more lenient than some during his daughter's seclusion, giving her such privileges as embroidery lessons and occasional appearances in public for special events.

During her seclusion, Kartini continued to self-educate herself. She was fluent in Dutch and acquired several Dutch pen pals. One of which, was a girl named Rosa Abendanon, who later became a close friend. Books, newspapers, and European magazines fed Kartini's interest in Europe and feminist thinking and overall fostered the desire to improve the conditions of indigenous Indonesian women, which at the time had a very low social status.

Kartini's reading included the Semarang newspaper, to which she began to send her own contributions that were published. Before she was 20 she had read Max Havelaar and Love Letters by Multatuli. She also read De Stille Kracht (The Hidden Force) by Louis Couperus, the works of Frederik van Eeden, Augusta de Witt, the Romantic-Feminist author Cécile de Jong van Beek en Donk, and an anti-war novel by Bertha von Suttner, Die Waffen Nieder! (Lay Down Your Arms!). All were in Dutch.

Kartini was not only concerned with the emancipation of women, but also with other social justice issues within her society. Kartini saw that the struggle for women to obtain their freedom, autonomy, and legal equality was just part of a wider movement.

Marriage, death and legacy
Kartini's parents arranged her marriage to Joyodiningrat, the Regent of Rembang, who had already married three wives. She was wed on 12 November 1903. She detested the marriage proposal at first, but her husband understood Kartini's aspirations and allowed her to establish a women's school on the eastern porch of Rembang's Regency Office complex. Kartini's only child was born on September 13, 1904. A few days later on 17 September 1904, Kartini died at the age of 25. She was buried at Bulu Village, Rembang.

Inspired by R.A. Kartini's example, the Van Deventer family established the R.A. Kartini Foundation which built schools for women, starting in 1912 with 'Kartini's Schools' in Semarang, and followed by other women's schools in Surabaya, Yogyakarta, Malang, Madiun, Cirebon, and other areas.

In 1964, President Sukarno declared R.A. Kartini's birth date, 21 April, as "Kartini Day"—an Indonesian national holiday. This decision has been criticized. It has been proposed that Kartini Day should be celebrated in conjunction with Indonesian Mothers’ Day on 22 December. So R.A. Kartini as a national heroine does not overshadow women who took arms to oppose the Dutch.

In contrast, those who recognize the significance of R.A. Kartini argue that not only was she an intellectual who elevated the status of Indonesian women, she was also a nationalist figure with modern ideas, who struggled on behalf of her people and played a role in the national struggle for independence.

Letters

After Kartini died, J.H. Abendanon, the Minister for Culture, Religion, and Industry in the East Indies, collected and published the letters that she had sent to her friends in Europe. The book was titled Door Duisternis tot Licht (Out of Dark Comes Light) and published in 1911. It went through five editions, with additional letters included in the final edition, and was translated into English by Agnes L. Symmers as Letters of a Javanese Princess. The publication of letters written by a native Javanese woman attracted great interest in the Netherlands, and Kartini's ideas began to change the way the Dutch viewed native women in Java. Her ideas also provided inspiration for prominent figures in the fight for independence.

This publication was edited to remove references to colonial figures, Islamic beliefs, and Javanese culture, and the English translation made further changes. Kartini's unedited letters were first published in English in 2014.

Ideas

Condition of Indonesian women

In her letters, Raden Adjeng Kartini wrote about her views of the social conditions prevailing at that time, particularly the condition of native Indonesian women. Most of her letters protest the Javanese cultural tendency to impose obstacles in women's development. She wanted women to have the freedom to learn and study. R.A. Kartini wrote of her ideas and ambitions, including Zelf-ontwikkeling, Zelf-onderricht, Zelf-vertrouwen, Zelf-werkzaamheid and Solidariteit. These ideas were all based on Religieusiteit, Wijsheid, en Schoonheid, that is, belief in God, wisdom, and beauty, along with Humanitarianismus (humanitarianism) and Nationalismus' (nationalism).

Kartini's letters also expressed her hopes for support from overseas. In her correspondence with Estell "Stella" Zeehandelaar, R.A. Kartini expressed her wish to be equal with European women. She depicted the sufferings of Javanese women fettered by tradition, unable to study, secluded, and who must be prepared to participate in polygamous marriages with men they don't know.

Vegetarianism

In letters dated to October 1902, Kartini expresses to Abendanon and her husband her desire to live a vegetarian life, which for her carried religious weight. Living a life as a vegetarian is a wordless prayer to the Almighty.

Further studies and teaching

Although Kartini's father allowed his daughters' schooling until the age of twelve, he firmly closed the door to further education. As a result, he prevented Kartini from continuing her studies in the Netherlands or enter medical school. Eventually, however, he gave permission for her to study to become a teacher in Batavia (now Jakarta). In the end, her plans to study in Japan changed into plans to journey to Tokyo, on the advice of Abendanon that this would be best for Kartini and her younger sister, Ayu Rukmini. In 1903, plans to become a teacher in Tokyo were abandoned due to Kartini's upcoming marriage:  In short, I no longer desire to take advantage of this opportunity because I am to be married. This was despite the Dutch Education Department finally giving permission for Kartini and Rukmini to study in Batavia.

As the wedding approached, R.A. Kartini's attitude towards Javanese traditional customs changed. She became more tolerant and felt her marriage would bring good fortune for her ambition to develop a school for native women. In her letters, she mentioned that her husband supported her desire to develop the Jepara woodcarving industry and a school for native women, but also mentioned that she was going to write a book. This ambition went unrealized due to her premature death in 1904.

Legacy
Kartini Schools opened in Bogor, Jakarta, and Malang. A society was also established in her name in the Netherlands.

She appeared twice in the Indonesian rupiah banknotes, in the 5 rupiah (1952 edition, which issued on 1953) and the 10,000 rupiah (1985 edition).

Kartini Day

Sukarno's Old Order state declared 21 April as Kartini Day to remind women that they should participate in "the hegemonic state discourse of pembangunan (development)". After 1965, however, Suharto's New Order state reconfigured the image of Kartini from that of radical women's emancipator to one that portrayed her as a dutiful wife and obedient daughter, "as only a woman dressed in a kebaya who can cook." On that occasion, popularly known as Hari Ibu Kartini or Mother Kartini Day, "young girls were to wear tight, fitted jackets, batik shirts, elaborate hairstyles, and ornate jewelry to school, supposedly replicating Kartini's attire but in reality, wearing an invented and more constricting ensemble than she ever did."

The melody of "Ibu Kita Kartini" (Our Mother Kartini) by W. R. Supratman:

Tribute
On April 21, 2016, Google celebrated her 137th birthday with a Google Doodle.

See also

 Gerwani

Notes

References
Primary sources
 Anonymous [Raden Adjeng Kartini] (1898), "The Jepara Manuscript." Presented at Nationale Tentoonstelling van Vrouwenarbeid 1898.
 Reprinted in Rouffaer and Juynboll (1912), De Batik-Kunst in Nederlandsch-Indië en haar Geschiedenis op Grond van Materiaal aanwezig in ’s Rijks Etnographisch Museum en Andere Openbare en Particuliere Verzamelingen in Nederland.
 Anonymous [Raden Adjeng Kartini] (1899), "Het Huwelijk bij de Kodja's." Bijdragen tot de Taal, Land, en Volkenkunde van Nederlandsch-Indië, vol. 6, no.1.
 Tiga Saudara [pseudonym of Raden Adjeng Kartini] (1899), "Een Gouverneur Generaals Dag." De Echo: weekblad voor dames in Indië, September 2–November 18, 1899.
 Tiga Saudara [pseudonym of Raden Adjeng Kartini] (1900), "Een Oorlogsschip op de Ree." De Echo: weekblad voor dames in Indië, April 5–June 10, 1900.
 Kartini (1903), "Van een Vergeten Uithoekje." Eigen Haard (Amsterdam), no. 1.
Posthumous publications:
 Kartini (1904). "Ontgoocheling." Weeklblad voor Indië (Surabaya), October 2, 1904.
 Raden Adjeng Kartini (1912), Door duisternis tot licht, with a foreword by J.H. Abendanon, The Hague
 Partial English translation, 1920: Letters of a Javanese princess, translated by Agnes Louise Symmers with a foreword by Louis Couperus, New York: Alfred A. Knopf,  (1986 edition),  (2005 edition)
 Partial Indonesian translation, 1938: Habis gelap tributlah terang, Balai Pustaka
 Raden Adjeng Kartini (1987), Brieven aan mevrouw R.M. Abendanon-Mandri en haar echtgenoot : met andere documenten. Dordrecht: Foris.
 Indonesian translation, 1989: Kartini surat-surat kepada Ny. R.M. Abendanon-Mandri dan suaminya. Jakarta: Djambatan.
 English translation, 1992: Letters from Kartini : an Indonesian feminist, 1900–1904. Clayton, Vict.: Monash Asia Institute.
 Raden Adjeng Kartini (1995), On Feminism and Nationalism: Kartini's Letters to Stella Zeehandelaar 1899–1903. Clayton, Vict.: Monash University.
 Indonesian translation, 2004: "Aku Mau ... Feminisme dan Nasionalisme. Surat-surat Kartini kepada Stella Zeehandelaar 1899–1903" (Jakarta : IRB Press)
 Raden Adjeng Kartini (2014), Kartini : the complete writings 1898–1904. Clayton, Victoria: Monash University.

Secondary sources
 M.C. Van Zeggelen (1945), "Kartini", J.M. Meulenhoff, Amsterdam (in Dutch)
 M.Vierhout (1942), "Raden Adjeng Kartini", Oceanus, Den Haag (in Dutch)
 Elisabeth Keesing (1999), Betapa besar pun sebuah sangkar; Hidup, suratan dan karya Kartini. Jakarta: Djambatan, v + 241 pp.
 J. Anten (2004), Honderd(vijfentwintig) jaar Raden Adjeng Kartini; Een Indonesische nationale heldin in beeld'', Nieuwsbrief Nederlands Fotogenootschap 43: 6–9.

External links

 
 
 
 
 

1879 births
1904 deaths
Deaths in childbirth
Indonesian feminists
Indonesian women's rights activists
National Heroes of Indonesia
Priyayi
Women's rights in Indonesia